The morningbird (Pachycephala tenebrosa) is a songbird species in the family Pachycephalidae.

Taxonomy and systematics
The morningbird was previously placed in the genus Colluricincla until 2013, when it was transferred to Pachycephala. Some authorities have placed the morningbird in the genus Pitohui and it is sometimes placed in its own monotypic genus, Malacolestes. Alternate names for the morningbird  include the brown pitohui, morning pitohui, morning whistler, Palau morningbird and Palau pitohui.

Distribution and habitat
The morningbird is endemic to the islands of Babeldaob, Koror, Ngercheu, Peleliu and Ngebad in Palau. Its natural habitat is deep primary tropical moist lowland forests. The species is non-migratory. It is apparently commoner on the smaller islands in its range.

Behaviour and ecology
Morningbirds feed principally on insects, but also take snails, berries, fruit and seeds. They feed on or around the ground.

Notes

References

Pachycephala
Birds of Palau
Endemic birds of Palau
Birds described in 1868
Taxonomy articles created by Polbot